Reginald 'Rex' Colin Townley CMG (15 April 1904 – 3 May 1982) was an Australian politician who served as leader of the Liberal Party in Tasmania from 1950 to 1956. He also played first-class cricket for the Tasmanian cricket team in his younger years, dismissing Donald Bradman in the 1935 season.

Cricket career

As Tasmania didn't compete in the Sheffield Shield at the time of his cricketing career, Townley's appearances for his state were limited to matches against touring sides such as the Marylebone Cricket Club and South Africa as well as out of season first-class fixtures against other Australian states.

A legbreak bowler, Townley took 36 wickets at 35.52 in first-class matches. His claim to fame as a cricketer was dismissing Donald Bradman, caught and bowled for 369, in a first-class match against South Australia, the legendary batsman's second highest ever score at that level. He also claimed in his career the wickets of English Test cricketer Ernest Tyldesley and South African Test player Bruce Mitchell.

Political career
Like his younger brother Athol, the Australian Minister for Defence from 1958 to 1963, Townley went into politics. He joined the Tasmanian House of Assembly at the 1946 election as an Independent, representing Denison.

The Liberal Party installed Townley as their leader for the 1950 election but lost to incumbent Premier Robert Cosgrove, despite achieving a 9.8% swing. With the Liberals regaining two seats which had been held by Independents since 1948, Labor stayed in power only thanks to the support of the remaining Independent, Bill Wedd.

Townley also led the Liberals into the 1955 election and picked up a seat to leave the House of Assembly with a deadlock as both parties had 15 seats out of a possible 30 in the assembly. Cosgrove however remained as Premier of Tasmania.

On 30 June 1965, Townley resigned from parliament, having never failed to defend his seat in an election.

See also
 List of Tasmanian representative cricketers

References

External links

Cricinfo: Reginald Townley
 Rex Townley at Cricket Archive

1904 births
1982 deaths
Australian cricketers
Tasmania cricketers
Liberal Party of Australia members of the Parliament of Tasmania
Members of the Tasmanian House of Assembly
Australian sportsperson-politicians
Leaders of the Opposition in Tasmania
20th-century Australian politicians